Richard Watt may refer to:
 Richard Harding Watt, English designer
 Richard M. Watt, American historian and writer

See also
 Richard Watts (disambiguation)